Anastasia Vladimirovna Bukhanko (born 6 June 1990) is a Russian tennis player.

Bukhanko has a career high WTA singles ranking of 1096 achieved on 6 April 2015 and a doubles ranking of 805 achieved on 21 March 2016.

Bukhanko made her WTA main draw debut at the 2013 Kremlin Cup in the doubles draw partnering Margarita Gasparyan.

References

External links
 
 

1990 births
Living people
Russian female tennis players
20th-century Russian women
21st-century Russian women